Jacques Edwin Brandenberger (19 October 1872 – 13 July 1954) was a Swiss chemist and textile engineer who in 1908 invented cellophane.  He was awarded the Franklin Institute's Elliott Cresson Medal in 1937.

Brandenberger was born in Zurich in 1872. He graduated from the University of Bern in 1895. In 1908 Brandenberger invented cellophane. Made from wood cellulose, cellophane was intended as a coating to make cloth more resistant to staining. After several years of further research and refinements, he began production of cellophane in 1920 marketing it for industrial purposes. He sold the US rights to DuPont in 1923.

References

External links
 Dr. J. E. Brandenberger Foundation
 Biography at National Inventors Hall of Fame
  Composite cellulose film, May 21, 1918

20th-century Swiss chemists
20th-century Swiss inventors
1872 births
People from Zürich
1954 deaths